Murray River is a rural municipality in Prince Edward Island, Canada. It is located in Kings County.

Located in the southeast corner of the province, Murray River is bisected by a river of the same name. The community is located at the end of navigation on the river and hosts a small wharf for fishing and recreational vessel.

Demographics 

Notable people 
Lorne Bonnell, former senator
Brandon Gormley, professional ice hockey player

References 

Communities in Kings County, Prince Edward Island
Rural municipalities in Prince Edward Island